TIO may refer to:

 Tia and Megumi Oumi, Japanese manga and anime characters
 Telecommunications Industry Ombudsman in Australia 
 Territory Insurance Office, an insurance company in the Northern Territory (Australia)
 Marrara Oval, currently known as TIO Stadium due to naming rights
 Telescope Instruments Operator
 TIO codes, trigraphs on Hewlett-Packard calculators supporting RPL